Lakeshore Light Opera (LLO) is an amateur community theatre group that performs Gilbert and Sullivan operas in Pointe-Claire, Quebec, Canada. The company produced its first show in 1955. Early in its history, the group was directed by former D'Oyly Carte Opera Company member Doris Hemingway, and briefly conducted by her husband, former D'Oyly Carte conductor Harry Norris. The group was known as St Paul's Operatic Society until 1980, when it changed its name to Lakeshore Light Opera. For over 35 years, proceeds from its annual production have been contributed to the Lakeshore General Hospital.

History

Early years
In 1955, a few members of the Men's Club of St. Paul's Anglican Church in Lachine, Quebec, in conjunction with the church choir, presented Gilbert and Sullivan's Trial by Jury in Montreal. The production led to the creation of a permanent operatic society dedicated to productions of Gilbert and Sullivan operas in the traditional style. In 1957, St Paul's Operatic Society was formed. Its first Music Director was Arthur Gough, the church organist, and the first Stage Director was Doris Hemingway, formerly of the D'Oyly Carte Opera Company. She and her husband, music director Harry Norris, a former D'Oyly Carte conductor, were already well known to Montreal Gilbert and Sullivan audiences through their association with the Lyric Opera Company, Montreal West Operatic Society and various other musical groups. In 1972, the society was incorporated as a non-profit corporation under the name of St. Paul's Operatic Society Inc.

In 1965, Leonard Langmead became stage director of the St. Paul's Operatic Society and served as stage director for nearly 35 years. Marian Siminski has been the company's music director since 1984.

Later history
In 1980, after the dissolution of ties with St. Paul’s Church, the name of the company was changed to Lakeshore Light Opera Inc. – La Société d'Opérette Lakeshore Inc. For over 35 years, proceeds from the annual production have been contributed to the Lakeshore General Hospital, through the Lakeshore General Hospital Foundation. The annual donations, reaching as high as $171,000, are used by the Hospital to purchase equipment not covered by its budget or by Provincial grants.

In 2005, LLO celebrated its 50th anniversary with a production of The Pirates of Penzance together with Trial by Jury, and since then it has continued to produce the Savoy operas. In 2015, LLO celebrated its 60th anniversary with another production of Pirates.

Theatre, membership and board
Lakeshore Light Opera performs at the Louise Chalmers Theatre at John Rennie High School, in Pointe-Claire, Quebec.

All actors, understudies, backstage, ushers, front of house people and Board of Directors are all volunteers. The membership consists of a wide range of ages. Over the years, LLO has bestowed life-time membership on individuals who have made a lasting impact on the Society.

Past productions 

1955 – Trial by Jury
1957 – The Sorcerer
1958 – H.M.S. Pinafore
1959 – The Pirates of Penzance
1960 – The Mikado
1961 – Patience
1962 – Iolanthe
1963 – The Yeomen of the Guard
1964 – The Gondoliers
1965 – The Mikado
1966 – Ruddigore
1967 – The Pirates of Penzance
1968 – H.M.S. Pinafore
1969 – Merrie England
1970 – The Geisha
1971 – The Gondoliers
1972 – Iolanthe
1973 – The Yeomen of the Guard
1974 – The Pirates of Penzance
1975 – Patience
1976 – The Mikado
1977 – Trial by Jury / H.M.S. Pinafore
1978 – The Gondoliers
1979 – Princess Ida
1980 – Iolanthe
1981 – Ruddigore
1982 – The Pirates of Penzance
1983 – The Mikado
1984 – The Yeomen of the Guard
1985 – Cox & Box / H.M.S. Pinafore
1986 – The Gondoliers
1987 – Patience
1988 – Ruddigore
1989 – The Pirates of Penzance
1990 – Princess Ida
1991 – Iolanthe
1992 – The Mikado
1993 – The Yeomen of the Guard
1994 – The Gondoliers
1995 – Trial by Jury & H.M.S. Pinafore
1996 – The Pirates of Penzance
1997 – Patience
1998 – Ruddigore
1999 – The Mikado
2000 – Iolanthe
2001 – Princess Ida
2002 – The Gondoliers
2003 – The Yeomen of the Guard
2004 – H.M.S. Pinafore
2005 – Trial by Jury / Pirates of Penzance
2006 – Patience
2007 – The Mikado
2008 – Ruddigore
2009 – The Gondoliers
2010 – Iolanthe
2011 – The Sorcerer
2012 – H.M.S. Pinafore / Cox & Box
2013 – Princess Ida
2014 – The Yeomen of the Guard
2015 – The Pirates of Penzance
2016 – Patience
2017 – Ruddigore
2018 – The Mikado

References

External links 
 

Musical groups from Quebec
Pointe-Claire
Musical groups established in 1955
Gilbert and Sullivan performing groups
1955 establishments in Quebec